A logical symbol is a fundamental concept in logic, tokens of which may be marks or a configuration of marks which form a particular pattern. Although the term "symbol" in common use refers at some times to the idea being symbolized, and at other times to the marks on a piece of paper or chalkboard which are being used to express that idea; in the formal languages studied in mathematics and logic, the term "symbol" refers to the idea, and the marks are considered to be a token instance of the symbol. In logic, symbols build literal utility to illustrate ideas.

Overview
Symbols of a formal language need not be symbols of anything. For instance there are logical constants which do not refer to any idea, but  rather serve as a form of punctuation in the language (e.g. parentheses). Symbols of a formal language must be capable of being specified without any reference to any interpretation of them.

A symbol or string of symbols may comprise a well-formed formula if it is consistent with the formation rules of the language.

In a formal system a symbol may be used as a token in formal operations.   The set of formal symbols in a formal language is referred to as an alphabet (hence each symbol may be referred to as a "letter")

A formal symbol as used in first-order logic may be a variable (member from a universe of discourse), a constant, a function (mapping to another member of universe) or a predicate (mapping to T/F).

Formal symbols are usually thought of as purely syntactic structures, composed into larger structures using a formal grammar, though sometimes they may be associated with an interpretation or model (a formal semantics).

Can words be modeled as formal symbols?

The move to view units in natural language (e.g. English)  as formal symbols was initiated by Noam Chomsky (it was this work that resulted in the Chomsky hierarchy in formal languages).  The generative grammar model looked upon syntax as autonomous from semantics.  Building on these models, the logician Richard Montague proposed that semantics could also be constructed on top of the formal structure:
There is in my opinion no important theoretical difference between natural languages and the artificial languages of logicians; indeed, I consider it possible to comprehend the syntax and semantics of both kinds of language within a single natural and mathematically precise theory. On this point I differ from a number of philosophers, but agree, I believe, with Chomsky and his associates."
This is the philosophical premise underlying Montague grammar.

However, this attempt to equate linguistic symbols with formal symbols has been challenged widely, particularly in the tradition of cognitive linguistics, by philosophers like Stevan Harnad, and linguists like George Lakoff and Ronald Langacker.

References

See also
List of mathematical symbols
List of logic symbols
Terminal and nonterminal symbols

Formal languages
Metalogic
Abstraction
Concepts in logic
Syntax (logic)